Phyllogomphus selysi is a species of dragonfly in the family Gomphidae. It is found in Angola, Botswana, Cameroon, the Republic of the Congo, the Democratic Republic of the Congo, Kenya, Malawi, Mozambique, Namibia, South Africa, Tanzania, Uganda, Zambia, Zimbabwe, and possibly Burundi. Its natural habitat is rivers.

References

Gomphidae
Taxonomy articles created by Polbot
Insects described in 1933